Bob Church may refer to:

People:
 Bob Church (geneticist) (1937–2019), Canadian livestock geneticist

Churches:
 Bob Church, Cluj, a Greek-Catholic church in Cluj-Napoca, Romania
 Bob Church, Mediaș, a Greek-Catholic church in Mediaș, Romania
 Bob Church, Târgu Mureș, a church in Târgu Mureș, Romania

See also
Robert Church (disambiguation)